These are the complete results of the athletics competition at the 1955 Mediterranean Games taking place between 18 and 24 July in Barcelona, Spain.

Results

100 meters
Heats – 20 July

Semifinals – 20 July

Final – 21 July

200 meters
Heats – 22 July

Final – 23 July

400 meters
Heats – 20 July

Semifinals – 20 July

Final – 21 July

800 meters
Heats – 22 July

Final – 24 July

1500 meters
21 July

5000 meters
22 July

10,000 meters
24 July

Marathon
18 July

110 meters hurdles
Heats – 21 July

Final – 22 July

400 meters hurdles
Heats – 23 July

Final – 24 July

3000 meters steeplechase
23 July

4 × 100 meters relay
24 July

4 × 400 meters relay
24 July

10 kilometers walk
21 July

50 kilometers walk
23 July

High jump
22 July

Pole vault
24 July

Long jump
23 July

Triple jump
20 July

Shot put
22 July

Discus throw
23 July

Hammer throw
21 July

Javelin throw
24 July

Decathlon
20–21 July

References

Mediterranean Games
1955